Kallmann is a German surname that may refer to
Franz Josef Kallmann (1897–1965), German-born American psychiatrist
Kallmann syndrome
Gerhard Kallmann (1915–2012), German-born American architect and academic
Kallmann McKinnell & Wood, an architectural design firm based in Boston, United States
Hans Jürgen Kallmann (1908–1991), German artist
Hartmut Kallmann (1896–1978), German physicist
Helmut Kallmann (1922–2012), Canadian musicologist and librarian

See also
Kallman
Callmann

German-language surnames